Saifuddin Khalid is a Pakistani politician who had been a Member of the Provincial Assembly of Sindh, from May 2013 to May 2018.

Early life 
He was born on 4 April 1967 in Karachi.

Political career

He was elected to the Provincial Assembly of Sindh as a candidate of Mutahida Quami Movement from Constituency PS-94 KARACHI-VI in 2013 Pakistani general election.

In April 2018, he quit MQM and joined Pak Sarzameen Party.

References

Living people
Sindh MPAs 2013–2018
1967 births
Muttahida Qaumi Movement politicians